The Alliance for Jewish Theatre is a non-profit cultural/educational organization based in the United States and a worldwide alliance of theatres, performance groups, and independent theatre-makers dedicated to the creation and production of Jewish and Israeli theatre in all of its forms. The organization changed its name from the Association for Jewish Theatre in late 2016. 

AJT’S mission is to develop, innovate, promote, and preserve theatre with a Jewish sensibility. As the leading organization for Jewish theatre worldwide.

Members include theatres, Artistic Directors of theatres, solo performers, playwrights, and any other theatre practitioners interested in Jewish content.

Organization

The Association held its first general meeting and first annual Jewish Theatre Festival at Marymount Manhattan College in June, 1980. Norman Fedder and Steven Reisner are credited with being the prime movers behind AJT's founding.

The President of AJT is Hank Kimmel. Its Executive Director is Jeremy Aluma. The association sees itself as part of the ethnic theatre movement, inspired especially by the black and Latino theatre movements.

According to The New York Times, the Association had “more than a score of members representing theater groups in the United States and Canada, from Phoenix, Ariz., to Winnipeg, Manitoba” by 1989 and was held to exemplify the “comeback” of explicitly Jewish theatre in America.

The organization sponsors yearly conferences, which are at times accompanied by theatre festivals.

References

External links
Official AJT Website

501(c)(3) organizations
 Theatrical organizations in the United States
 Jewish theatre
 Jewish charities based in the United States
 Charities based in Illinois